Groumdji   is a department of the Maradi Region of Niger. Its capital lies at the city of Guidan Roumdji. As of 2011, the department had a total population of 485,743 people.

References

Departments of Niger
Maradi Region